Quarmby is a surname. Notable people with the surname include:

John Quarmby (1929–2019), English actor
Jonathan Quarmby (born 1961), English record producer and songwriter
Lynne Quarmby, Canadian scientist, activist and politician